Poppo I may refer to:

 Poppo I, Margrave of Carniola (died before 1044)
 Poppo I of Blankenburg (ca. 1095–1161 or 1164)